Tsechen Monastery, Tsechen Dzong or Shambu Tsegu, was about  northwest of Gyantse above the traditional village of the same name. Tsechen was the largest of a number of hilltop monastery-forts ringing the valley, none of which would be easy to assault. The fortress, or dzong, was considered to be almost as strong as the Gyantse Dzong. It was "built on another precipitous hill about 600 feet [183 metres] high, about one mile [1.6 km] long, and rising abruptly out of the plain occupied by at least 1,000 of the enemy who cheered vociferously when they saw us retire."

Early history
It was founded by Nyawon Kunga Pel (1285 - 1379) in 1366, under the sponsorship of Prince Phakpa Pelzangpo (1318-1370 CE), Gyantse's first prince. Nyawon Kunga Pel gave teachings to about 600 disciples in epistemology and the Kalachakra Tantra. He invited Drigung Lotsāwa Maṇikaśrījñāna (1289 - 1363) to Tsechen for teachings.

Tsechen was the seat of the kings of Gyantse until the town expanded in the 15th century. Tsongkapa's principal teacher, Remdawa Zhonu Lodro Zhonu (1349–1412), resided here. Jamyang Konchok Zangpo (1398 - 1475),  the 14th Throne Holder of Jokhang Monastery, held the monastic seat at Tsechen for a time; Namkha Chokyong (1436 - 1507) the 14th Throne Holder of Jokhang Monastery, held the monastic seat at Tsechen for an extended period.

It was the seat of the incarnation of Buton Rinchendrub, known as Kungra Lodro.

20th century to present
On 28 June, during the British expedition to Tibet, Brigadier-General Macdonald, who had just arrived that day, concluded that Tsechen, which guarded the rear of the Gyantse Dzong, would have to be cleared before the assault of Gyantse Dzong could begin. Shortly before sunset, that same day, the nearby "seemingly impregnable" Tsechen Monastery and Dzong was stormed, after a heavy bombardment by the British ten-pound cannon.  
 
"Tsechen was the site of one of the major battles of the Younghusband expedition en route for Lhasa. "A force of 1200 Tibetans held a fortified monastery at Tsechen which guarded the Shigatse road ... The capture of the monastery opened the road to Lhasa and effectively meant that all routes in and out of Gyantse were controlled by the British Tibet expedition."

As the monastery had put up resistance it was considered "fair game" and sacked. Then, on 5 July, coinciding with the beginning of the assault on Gyantse Dzong, the monastery was set on fire causing a 'tremendous blaze' which burned throughout the night, to prevent it being reoccupied by the Tibetans.

N. Rybot noted on a drawing he made of the destroyed monastery: "Captured 28 June 04 Looted 29 June 04 Burnt 5 July 04."

There are extensive views of the valley from the remains of the old walls. All that is left today are some of the walls on the hilltop.

Footnotes

References
 Allen, Charles. (2004). Duel in the Snows: The True Story of the Younghusband Mission to Lhasa. John Murray (publishers), London. .
 Dorje, Gyurme (2009). Footprint Tibet Handbook. Footprint Publications. .
 Mayhew, Bradley and Kohn, Michael (2005). Tibet. 6th Edition. Lonely Planet. .

External links
 1927 photos of Tsechen Monastery

Forts in Tibet
Dzongs in Tibet
Buddhist temples in Tibet
14th-century establishments in Tibet
Sakya monasteries and temples